Hans Berger (6 January 1906 – 21 December 1973) was a German boxer. He competed in the men's light heavyweight event at the 1932 Summer Olympics.

References

1906 births
1973 deaths
German male boxers
Olympic boxers of Germany
Boxers at the 1932 Summer Olympics
Sportspeople from Duisburg
Light-heavyweight boxers
20th-century German people